Poropodalius is a genus of mites in the family Rhodacaridae. There are about five described species in Poropodalius.

Species
These five species belong to the genus Poropodalius:
 Poropodalius acutus Karg, 2000
 Poropodalius basisetae Karg, 2000
 Poropodalius crispus Karg, 2000
 Poropodalius hexapennatus Karg, 2000
 Poropodalius medioflagelli Karg & Schorlemmer, 2009

References

Rhodacaridae